Manhunt is a 2008 Norwegian horror film directed by Patrik Syversen.

Synopsis 
The story is set in 1974. Four friends—Camilla, Roger, Mia and Jørgen—go for a vacation in a forest. They stop at an inn and meet people and a girl who joins their group. Their newfound friend takes them on a journey to the deep end of the forest, where they become systematically hunted and killed for sport by a party of locals. The friends try to escape while avoiding a series of traps the trackers left on the place.

Reception 
The film had mixed reviews, with a "die throw" of 3 out of 6 in both Verdens Gang and Dagbladet, and 4 given in Nettavisen and Dagsavisen. ABC Nyheter had a different grading system, giving it 5 out of 10.

Soundtrack 
The opening track "Wait For The Rain", which is sung and was written by David Hess, is the original score song of The Last House on the Left, which also starred Hess. The end theme "En Spennende Dag For Josefine" is a Norwegian folkloric pop song sung by Inger Lise Rypdal.

References

Norwegian horror films
2000s Norwegian-language films
2008 films
2008 horror films
Norwegian slasher films
Films scored by Simon Boswell